Izadkhvast-e Sharqi Rural District is a rural district (dehestan) in Izadkhvast District, Zarrin Dasht County, Fars Province, Iran. At the 2006 census, its population was 3,014, in 664 families.  The rural district has 6 villages.

References 

Rural Districts of Fars Province
Zarrin Dasht County